Lakota Local Schools is a public school district serving students from West Chester and Liberty townships in Butler County, Ohio, in the northern suburbs of Cincinnati. Serving nearly 15,000 students, it is the largest school district in Butler County, second largest in southwestern Ohio and the seventh largest in the U.S. state of Ohio. It operates six early childhood (PK-2) schools, eight elementary schools, four junior high schools, two freshman schools and two high schools.

Lakota was rated 'Excellent with Distinction' in the most recent Ohio Department of Education report card (2010–11), ranking in the top 7% of school districts statewide. They met 26 of 26 state indicators and had a graduation rate of over 95%. It is the largest school district in the state to earn the 'Excellent' designation.

History 
The district in its current configuration was established in 1957 after the Union and Liberty school districts were combined. The district was originally known as the Liberty-Union School District and was renamed to Lakota Local School District in 1970.

Two of the district's schools, Union Elementary (1916) and Liberty Elementary (1928), were built prior to the consolidation.  Liberty Elementary is still standing but Union Elementary has since been demolished. In 1959, the Board of Education built a high school for the district; three years later, a third elementary (Hopewell) was added.

From 1969 to 1978, three junior schools were built. The first, Lakota Junior School (1969), was built next to the high school and was later used as a freshman wing of the high school, and then the Lakota Early Childhood Center. It is now used to house the Creekside Early Childhood School. Hopewell Junior was opened in 1973, and Lakota Junior was replaced by Liberty Junior when it opened in 1976. Adena Elementary became the district's fourth when it opened in 1978.

Freedom Elementary opened in 1988, the same year an addition was built onto the high school. Two years later in 1990, Woodland and Shawnee elementary opened their doors. From 1992 to 1994, three new elementary schools (Heritage-1992, Cherokee, and Independence-1994), and a separate freshman building (1993) were built, as well as additions to six other buildings.

1997 marked the largest expansion to the Lakota district. In that year, two new high schools were opened (Lakota East and Lakota West). Freshmen were moved to the old high school building, and the freshman building became a third junior school (Lakota Ridge). Kindergarten students from most of the elementary schools were consolidated into the Lakota Early Childhood Center, which also holds preschool classes.

In 2003, Van Gorden Elementary (named after the family that donated the land it sits on) and Lakota Plains Junior School were opened, along with a new Central Office Building.

Starting from the school year 2007–08, there were many transfers throughout the district. New schools were being built and some students, as well as staff, were relocated to new schools.
Lakota East Freshman school opened in the 2008–2009 school year for students who will attend Lakota East. The building that once contained freshmen for both high schools (which was once the old high school itself previous to 1997), became Lakota West Freshman for the students who will attend Lakota West.

Athletics 

The Lakota district competes in the Greater Miami Conference (GMC) in 24 varsity sports.

Schools

Secondary (9-12)
Lakota East High School
Lakota West High School
Lakota East Freshman Campus(2008)
Lakota West Freshman Campus(1960, 1997)

Middle (7-8)
Hopewell Junior School(1973)
Liberty Junior School(1977)
Lakota Plains Junior School(2003)
Lakota Ridge Junior School(1997)

Elementary (3-6)
Adena Elementary School(1978)
Cherokee Elementary School(1992)
Endeavor Elementary School(2007)
Freedom Elementary School(1988)
Independence Elementary School(1994)
Union Elementary School(1916)
Van Gorden Elementary School(2003)
Woodland Elementary School(1990)

Primary (PK-2)
Creekside Early Childhood School
Liberty Early Childhood School(2008)
Shawnee Early Childhood School
Wyandot Early Childhood School(2007)
Hopewell Early Childhood School(2018)
Heritage Early Childhood School(2018)

References

External links 

Lakota East Bands
Lakota West Bands
Lakota Alumni

Education in Butler County, Ohio
School districts in Ohio
School districts established in 1957
1957 establishments in Ohio